The golden bandicoot (Isoodon auratus; Yolngu: Wan'kurra) is a short-nosed bandicoot found in northern Australia. It is the smallest of its genus.

The golden bandicoot is now a threatened species. It was once found throughout much of northwestern Australia, with even a patch on the New South Wales/South Australia border, but it is now restricted to the Kimberley region of Western Australia, and to Augustus, Barrow and Middle Islands off of Western Australia (I. auratus barrowensis) and Marchinbar Island of Northern Territory. It is distinguished from the brown bandicoots by its golden colouring and much smaller size.

Taxonomy
Recent genetic evidence suggests that the not only is the golden bandicoot (I. auratus) closely related to the southern brown bandicoot. (I. obesulus), but that they may in fact be the same species. Mitochondrial DNA evidence suggests that these two species ought to be grouped into one species with 3 distinct subspecies, I. obesulus obesulus, I. o. peninsulae, and I. o. fusciventer. I. auratus would be included in the I. o. fusciventer subspecies, but these changes have yet to be accepted. These two appear to have been allopatric ever since the Pleistocene, long before the arrival of Europeans. The golden bandicoot is also superficially similar to the relatively common northern brown bandicoot (I. macrourus), but it can be distinguished by its smaller size, the shape of its hairs, and its more elongated head. In the current classification, three subspecies are recognised: I.a. auratus, I.a. arnhemensis, and I.a. barrowensis.

Distribution

Range
The largest golden bandicoot population lives on Barrow Island because no cats or foxes have been introduced to the island, and other populations exist on Middle, Marchinbar, Augustus Islands. Small populations on mainland Australia are located in the Northern Territory and Western Australia. The golden bandicoot once lived all throughout Central Australia, but by 1992 it had been reduced to a small area in northwest Kimberly and Arnhem Land. In 2000, it was assumed that the species was extinct on the mainland. 

In the 1930s, the golden bandicoot was well spread throughout central Australia, but by 1983 the only populations on the mainland remained in the Prince Regent National Park in the Kimberley region.  It occurs in stable numbers on Barrow, Middle and Augustus Islands, and by 1995 it was known to live in the Yampi Peninsula in northern Kimberley and Marchinbar Island in the Northern Territory. I. a. auratus occurs in the north-western Kimberley and the Augustus and Uwins Islands, I.a. barrowensis occurs on Barrow and Middle Islands off the Pilbara coast, and I. a. arnhemensis has been recorded in Arnhem Land.

It is present in the Charnley River–Artesian Range Wildlife Sanctuary in the Kimberley region of WA.

Habitat
The golden bandicoot lives in spinifex and tussock grasslands, and it used to be widely distributed in arid deserts and the surrounding semi-arid areas as well as tropical forests and woodlands. In Northern Kimberley, it is found along the margins of rainforests lined with sandstone, and in the Yampi Peninsula it inhabits eucalypt woodlands. On Augustus and Marchinbar Islands it lives amongst sandstone in hummock grassland and heath or eucalypt woodlands, and on Barrow and Middle Islands it is found in grasslands and coastal shrub. Its range once included the Gibson, Great Sandy, Great Victoria, Little Sandy, and Tanami deserts. It is believed that the golden bandicoot disappeared from the deserts between the 1940s and 1960s.

Population numbers

In fact, it is the most common mammal on the island. On Middle Island it is estimated that there are about 1,000 individuals, and on Marchinbar Island there are roughly 1,400 individuals. On mainland Australia, populations are sparse, and most population declines have occurred there.

Physical characteristics

External anatomy

It is the smallest of the short-nosed bandicoots with a golden colour back, hence the name, finely streaked with black fur. The sides and face are a faded light rust colour, and the underbelly is pale amber. The feet are the same colour as the underbelly and have sharp claws. The species was first described in 1897 from a specimen collected near Derby, Western Australia. As with most bandicoots, the golden bandicoot has a rather long, flat, pointy nose. It is an omnivore, consuming succulents, insects, plant bulbs, and small reptiles. The golden bandicoot is nocturnal, foraging at night by digging small holes in the ground to find food.

The golden bandicoot is quite rat-like in appearance due to its small body, hunched-over posture, and relatively long tail. The hind limbs are large and muscular compared to the short forelimbs. Each forefoot has three toes with flat claws, used for digging holes when hunting for prey. And, unlike most marsupials, the golden bandicoot has fused toes on its hind feet, forming a comb they use for grooming. All bandicoots in the genus Isoodon have short noses and small, rounded ears, and thus can be distinguished from most other bandicoots, which have longer noses and larger ears. Female golden bandicoots have eight teats in the rear-opening pouch.

Physiology

Living in hot, semi-arid environments, the golden bandicoot is well adapted to keeping cool. Indeed, it is one of only two extant bandicoot species that are especially suited for arid environments, the other one being the bilby (Macrotis lagotis). Measurements in the laboratory show that the golden bandicoot has a low body temperature that is constantly changing; in this sense it is heterothermic. This allows the internal body temperature to fluctuate in response to extreme environmental temperatures without inhibiting and denaturing necessary proteins. Additionally, it has a low basal metabolic rate, low thermal conductance, and low rate of evaporative water loss. A low metabolic rate correlates to less heat being produced by the body, and a low thermal conductance does not allow the golden bandicoot to capture and store heat well. A highly efficient panting mechanism allows for a low rate of evaporative water loss when cooling the body, conserving precious water. This is an indispensable advantage in arid and dry environments.

Behaviour

Foraging

The golden bandicoot is nocturnal. During the day, it sleeps in dense vegetation or a hollow tree, making nests out of sticks, leaves, and grass. At night, it actively forages by digging shallow conical pits in the ground to root up succulents (their primary source of water), invertebrates, and plant roots. Because of this, its vision and sense of smell are highly developed, allowing it to see in low light and detect prey items by smell when digging. The golden bandicoot will also burrow in the soil if the temperature rises in order to keep cool.

Reproduction

Breeding occurs throughout the year and peaks during the wet season (December  January) and the dry season (August). Amongst marsupials, the golden bandicoot is known to have one of the highest reproductive rates, and it has one of the shortest gestation periods for mammals, only about 12 days. There are about 2–3 young per litter, and they remain in the pouch of the mother for up to 8 weeks. After this, there is little to no parental care, which allows the golden bandicoot to be such a prolific breeder.

Threats

Competition

Several factors have contributed to the decline of golden bandicoot numbers throughout the century including introduced species, exotic predators, and loss of habitat. On Middle and Barrow Islands, competition with the introduced black rat (Rattus rattus) reduced golden bandicoot numbers significantly in the 1990s, but the black rat was successfully eradicated from these islands in 1993. Since then golden bandicoot numbers have increased five-fold. Additional competition comes from various rabbit species.

Predation

Large birds are the primary, natural predator of the golden bandicoot, but many predatory species have been introduced within its range. The European red fox (Vulpes vulpes), feral cats, and feral dogs all prey upon the golden bandicoot. When feral cats were introduced to Hermite Island, the golden bandicoot quickly became extinct just before 1912. On Marchinbar Island, hair samples from the golden bandicoot have been recovered in scat samples from feral dogs, and Aboriginal people have been known to hunt them as well.

Habitat alteration

Changes in fire regions have been cited as another major factor in the decline of the golden bandicoot. Reduced groundcover due to fires makes the golden bandicoot more exposed to predation, but it has been reported that the golden bandicoot prefers areas that have been burnt relatively recently, as these have fresh new vegetation close to the ground.

Conservation efforts

A national recovery plan for the golden bandicoot and the golden-backed tree rat (Mesembriomys macrurus ) was established in 2003 for a 5-year period between 2004–2009 with 3 management priorities summarised as follows:

 Form management arrangements between agencies, land managers, and land owners
 Form a multiple species recovery team to attack the issue of multiple species decline in northern Australia
 Monitor population trends
 Translocate golden bandicoots from Marchinbar Island to two other islands and follow up on said populations
 Identify the key components that affect critical weight range of tropical savannah mammals
 Develop educational materials to effectively communicate to stakeholders
 Inform and involve the community in recovery process

Both the Parks and Wildlife Service and the Gumurr Marthakal Rangers are involved in a collaborative program to monitor existing populations, search for new populations, and look for opportunities to translocate specimen.

In culture
The animal, known as Wan'kurra in the Yolngu language, features prominently in song-cycles in the ceremonies of the Gumatj people of Arnhem Land. It is a common motif in the work of artist Nancy Gaymala Yunupingu, often running through scrubland.

References

External links
ARKive - images and movies of the golden bandicoot (Isoodon auratus)
 Wildscreen Arkive
 Australian Fauna

Peramelemorphs
Vulnerable fauna of Australia
Mammals of Western Australia
Extinct mammals of South Australia
Mammals of the Northern Territory
Marsupials of Australia
Mammals described in 1887